Billbergia tessmannii is a species of flowering plant in the genus Billbergia. It is endemic to Peru.

Cultivars
 Billbergia 'Bam'
 Billbergia 'Selby'
 Billbergia 'Sunset'

References

tessmannii
Endemic flora of Peru
Plants described in 1927